Peter van Riper (July 8, 1942 – November 18, 1998) was a sound and light environment artist, musician and pioneer of laser art and holography.

Biography
Van Riper was born in Detroit's Inner City, Michigan, the son of a psychoanalyst and an avid record collector. During the 1960s he received a B.A. Far Eastern History, and Art History from the University of North Carolina, Chapel Hill, 
graduated in Art History at Tokyo University, and took part in Fluxus performances and exhibitions in Japan. He later appeared on Tellus Audio Cassette Magazine #24 FluxTellus, Harvestworks, 1990, as part of an ensemble performing George Maciunas's Solo For Lips And Tongue. He collaborated with Fluxus members during exhibitions and performances, but Van Riper's influences are much wider. He is a true sound artist whose music is often inspired by Far Eastern traditions from Japan or Indonesia.

From 1967 to 1970, van Riper was a member of Editions Inc., an Ann Arbor, Michigan gallery of holography, animated along laser physicist Lloyd Cross and artist Jerry Pethick (1935–2003). In 1970 they organized an exhibition at the Cranbrook Academy, and at the Finch College Museum in New York. Both Cross and Pethick co-founded the School of Holography, San Francisco, California. Van Riper exhibited holograms during The Nature Of Light: Exploring Unconventional Photographic Techniques exhibition, Joyce Goldstein Gallery, New York, 1996, and also created a sound performance during the exhibition opening.

Collaborations
With choreographer Simone Forti
In the late 1970s and early 1980s, Van Riper worked with dancer Simone Forti, providing lighting design and live sound accompaniment to her dance performances. An avant garde dancer and choreographer, Forti took part in some of Allan Kaprow's 1960s happenings and specialized in improvised dancing. While working with her, Van Riper mostly used soprano and sopranino saxophones but also various devices and objects or even tape music. He also moved freely around the stage and dancer.

With visual artist Eugènia Balcells

Van Riper provided what he calls Acobxcvxcvustic Metal Music and small percussion works to Barcelona video and installation artist Eugènia Balcells (born 1943), who settled in New York from 1979 to 1988. For TV Weave, an installation with TV screens first showed at Metrònom gallery, Barcelona, 1985, Peter Van Riper played chiming music from suspended aluminium baseball bats. An excerpt from aluminium baseball bats music can be found on The Aerial #4 CD. Says Balcells: 

With performance artist Sha Sha Higby

Van Riper collaborated with yet another performance artist: Sha Sha Higby.

Other works 
On December 6, 1982, he performed together with Jackson Mac Low and percussionist Z'EV, during a show called Language/Theater: Language/Noise, at Martinson Hall, Public Theater, New York. That same year he was included in a collective exhibition called Young Fluxus, Artists Space gallery, New York, 1982. 
He composed music for Seven Days in Space, a 90' video of NASA space exploration:

List of sound works 
 The Simple Existence of Any One Thing, in 'Everson Video 75', Everson Museum of Art, Syracuse, NY, 1975
 Big Room for kalimba, saxophones and plastic hose (w/ Forti choreography), 1975
 Red Green (w/ Forti choreography), 1975
 Plumbing Music, tape music created for a Simone Forti choreography 'Planet', 1976
 Three From Piru for a Simone Forti choreography 'Fan Dance', 1975
 This, a 3 channel installation with book, The Kitchen, New York, NY, December 1976
 It readings for performance, The Kitchen, New York, NY, December 1976
 Art on the Beach collective exhibition, Battery Park, Lower Manhattan, NY, 1978
 Home Base for plastic hose named 'molino', moku gyo (Japanese wooden bell) and mbira (African thumb piano), for a Simone Forti choreography, The Kitchen, New york 1979
 Indian Cicle for sopranino (video performance by Eugènia Balcells), 1981
 TV Weave, for aluminium baseball bats, music for Eugènia Balcells' installation, Metrònom gallery, Barcelona, 1985
 Sound/Light for Japanese gong to an Eugènia Balcells installation, Metrònom gallery, Barcelona and Experimental Intermedia Foundation, NY, 1985
 Shadows, sound installation w/ Eugènia Balcells, Roulette, NY, 1987
 Seeing/Hearing, 1991 (w/ Forti choreography)
 Collaboration, 1991 (w/ Forti choreography)

Recorded music 
 Sound To Movement. New Music For Saxophones, LP, 1979 VRBLU, (A-1982-48)
 Room Space. New Music For Saxophones, LP, 1981 VRBLU (A-1982-49)
 Windows to the Sky , LP	
 Music for Spaces, LP
 Indian Circle", cassette, self-release
 Direct Contact, cassette, Deep Listening Institute
 Sustainable Music, cassette, Deep Listening Institute
 Music for Spaces CD, Van Riper Editions, 1997
 Marking Time CD-ROM, in collaboration with Jerry Pethick, Kamloops Art Gallery, 1998

Appears on:
 George Maciunas Solo For Lips And Tongue, included in Tellus Audio Cassette Magazine #24 FluxTellus, Harvestworks, 1990
 Heart included in The Aerial #4 cassette & CD, What Next? label, 1991
 Acoustic Metal Music included in Anti-Disc I, 33rpm flexi disc, Anti-Utopia, 1990
 NAP CD Connection'', CD published by New Arts Program, Pennsylvania

References

External links
 Van Riper page at Deep Listening Institute
 Eugènia Balcells' web site
 Holography history.
 Kalvos & Damian 2 radio shows with Peter Van Riper, November 1997.
 Tumblr weblog

Postmodern artists
American contemporary artists
American sound artists
Laser art
American people of Dutch descent
American experimental musicians
American male composers
1998 deaths
1942 births
20th-century American composers
20th-century American male musicians